SPSA can refer to:
Scottish Police Services Authority, a public body of the Scottish Government responsible for certain central services for police forces
Southeastern Public Service Authority, the solid waste management agency for the one-million-population region south of Hampton Roads Harbor and the lower James River in Virginia, United States
Simultaneous perturbation stochastic approximation, a stochastic method for optimization, especially appropriate for multivariable problems 
 Sindh Punjabi Student Association
 Somerset Prostate Support Association, a UK charity providing support to men who have prostate problems including prostate cancer and support to their families